The Kennedy Compound consists of three houses on  of waterfront property on Cape Cod along Nantucket Sound in Hyannis Port, Massachusetts, in the United States. It was once the home of Joseph P. Kennedy, an American businessman, investor, politician, and U.S. ambassador to the United Kingdom; his wife, Rose; and their children, including U.S. President John F. Kennedy and U.S. Senators Robert F. Kennedy and Edward M. Kennedy. As an adult, the youngest son, Edward, lived in his parents' house, and it was his primary residence from 1982 until he died of brain cancer at the compound, in August 2009.

John F. Kennedy used the compound as a base for his successful 1960 U.S. presidential campaign and later as a summer White House and presidential retreat, until his assassination in November 1963. In 2012, the main house was donated to the Edward M. Kennedy Institute for the United States Senate. As of 2020, Robert Kennedy's widow Ethel lives in their home adjacent to the main house.

History
In 1926 Joseph P. Kennedy rented a summer cottage at 50 Marchant Avenue in Hyannis Port. Two years later, he purchased the structure, which had been erected in 1904, and enlarged and remodeled it to suit his growing family's needs. In and around this house, their nine children spent their summers, acquiring a lifelong interest in sailing and other competitive activities.

In 1956, John bought a smaller home of his own at 111 Irving Avenue,() not far from his father's home. In 1959 Edward acquired the residence at 28 Marchant Avenue adjacent to the other two but in 1961 sold it to Robert and his wife Ethel. Edward lived in the main house at the compound until his death.

Current residence
In 2019, one of Robert Kennedy's granddaughters, 22-year-old Saoirse Kennedy Hill (daughter of Kennedy's daughter Courtney), died of an overdose in a residence at the compound, where her grandmother Ethel Kennedy lives.

Layout

All three buildings are white, frame, clapboard structures typical of vacation residences on Cape Cod. Except for specific occasions at the Main House, the buildings are not available for public visitation.

Main house
Joseph's home, the Main House and the largest of the three, is surrounded by well-tended lawns and gardens and it commands sweeping views of the ocean from its long porches.

On the main floor are a living room, dining room, sun room, television room, kitchen, various pantries, utility rooms and the bedroom that John used before he purchased his own house in the compound.

On the second floor are six bedrooms, a sewing room, packing room, and four servants' bedrooms. The house has a full attic.

The basement contains a motion-picture theater and a hall covered with dolls from all around the world.

The house has changed little, either structurally or in furnishings, since President Kennedy's association with it.

In 2012, the main house was donated by the Kennedy family to the Edward M. Kennedy Institute for the United States Senate. On the grounds are an enclosed swimming pool, tennis court, a four-car garage, and two guest houses.

There are two circular driveways with flagpoles standing in the middle, a boathouse and several large stretches of lawn area where many of the family touch football games were played.

Other parcels of land that assorted members of the family have purchased remain as well-tended as those of the more prominent homes.

See also
List of National Historic Landmarks in Massachusetts
List of residences of presidents of the United States
National Register of Historic Places listings in Barnstable County, Massachusetts

References

Sources

External links
 

John F. Kennedy
Kennedy family residences
National Historic Landmarks in Massachusetts
Robert F. Kennedy
Houses in Barnstable, Massachusetts
Houses completed in 1904
Presidential homes in the United States
National Register of Historic Places in Barnstable County, Massachusetts
Historic district contributing properties in Massachusetts
Jacqueline Kennedy Onassis
Houses on the National Register of Historic Places in Barnstable County, Massachusetts